List of radio stations in the Cordillera Administrative Region of the Philippines.

Abra

AM stations

FM stations

Apayao

AM stations

No AM Station in Apayao; however, AM radio stations in Metro Manila are being relayed to the stations' transmitter sites situated elsewhere in the province.

FM stations

Kalinga

AM stations

FM stations

Mountain Province

AM stations

FM stations

Ifugao

AM stations

''No AM Station in Ifugao; however, AM radio stations in Metro Manila are being relayed to the stations' transmitter sites situated elsewhere in the province.

FM stations

Benguet

AM stations

FM stations

References

Cordillera Autonomous Region
Radio stations